Matthew David Hoare (born 3 May 1995) is a former English professional footballer.

Career statistics

Club

Notes

References

External links
 Yau Yee Football League profile

Living people
1995 births
English footballers
Association football midfielders
Hong Kong Premier League players
Hong Kong First Division League players
Hong Kong FC players
English expatriate footballers
English expatriate sportspeople in Hong Kong
Expatriate footballers in Hong Kong